Lake Ihema  is a lake in the east of Rwanda, at the border with Tanzania. The lake lies within the marshland of the Kagera River in which it empties via a very short channel. The lake is located in Kayonza District in the southern part of Akagera National Park which contains more than another dozen of lakes, of which Ihema is the largest.  

The lake is rich in biodiversity, except fish. It is home to hippopotamuses and crocodiles. It has 550 species of birds, including remarkable species such as the shoebill (Balaeniceps rex) and the papyrus gonolek (Laniarius mufumbiri). Among the endemic species, there are ibises, jacanas, herons, plovers, sandpipers, malachite kingfishers, hawks and many others.

References

External links
Lake Ihema

Ihema
Ramsar sites in Rwanda